Treffurt is a small town in the western region of the Wartburgkreis district which belongs to the federal state of Thuringia. The former municipality Ifta was merged into Treffurt in January 2019. The town lies near the Werra and is surrounded by the Werratal valley and rivers. Treffurt is located next to the Hessian border and was a former part of the Sperrzone. Today, Treffurt is a tourist destination, especially due to its scenic town centre with many restored half-timbered houses and its landmark - the Normannstein castle.

Notable residents

Egon Bahr (1922-2015), German SPD politician
Christian Mengis (flourished c.1745 – c.1766), composer and horn player

References

External links
Town Website
Tourist Info

Wartburgkreis